Surfbook was an early social networking service created by Dutch programmer Joannes Jozef Everardus van der Meer in the years prior to his death in June 2004. Surfbook was based on technologies whose patents were filed by Van der Meer in 1998 and granted in 2001 and 2002. It allowed users share their information with selected people and approve posts using a "Like" button, and to link to external information. 

On February 5, 2013, holders of the patents related to this site (Rembrandt Social Media, LP) filed a lawsuit against Facebook for infringement. In June 2014, Facebook successfully defended itself against the lawsuit after a jury found that Facebook did not infringe the patents, and separately found the patents to be invalid.  The plaintiff (Rembrandt Social Media, LP) appealed the verdict, but it was upheld by a federal appeals court in February 2016.

References

Defunct social networking services
Dutch social networking websites